Yusufeli District is a district of Artvin Province of Turkey. Its seat is the town Yusufeli. Its area is 2,261 km2, and its population is 19,510 (2021).

Composition
There is one municipality in Yusufeli District:
 Yusufeli

There are 63 villages in Yusufeli District:

 Alanbaşı
 Altıparmak (Parkhali)
 Arpacık
 Avcılar
 Bademkaya
 Bahçeli
 Bakırtepe
 Balalan
 Balcılı
 Bıçakçılar
 Bostancı
 Boyalı
 Çağlıyan
 Çamlıca
 Çeltikdüzü
 Cevizlik
 Çevreli
 Çıralı
 Dağeteği
 Darıca
 Demirdöven
 Demirkent
 Demirköy
 Dereiçi
 Dokumacılar
 Erenköy
 Esendal
 Esenyaka
 Gümüşözü
 Günyayla
 Havuzlu
 İnanlı
 Irmakyanı
 İşhan
 Kılıçkaya
 Kınalıçam
 Kirazalan
 Kömürlü
 Köprügören
 Küplüce
 Meşecik
 Morkaya
 Mutlugün
 Narlık
 Öğdem
 Ormandibi
 Özgüven
 Pamukçular
 Sebzeciler
 Serinsu
 Sütlüce
 Tarakçılar
 Taşkıran
 Tekkale
 Yağcılar
 Yamaçüstü
 Yarbaşı
 Yaylalar
 Yeniköy
 Yokuşlu
 Yüksekoba
 Yüncüler
 Zeytincik

References

Districts of Artvin Province